Enterprise, California may refer to:
Enterprise, Amador County, California
Enterprise, Butte County, California
Enterprise, Lake County, California
Enterprise, Shasta County, California